Cyril Pearce (28 January 1908 – 1990) was an English footballer who played in the Football League for Charlton Athletic, Newport County and Swansea Town.

References

1908 births
1990 deaths
English footballers
English Football League players
Wolverhampton Wanderers F.C. players
Newport County A.F.C. players
Swansea City A.F.C. players
Charlton Athletic F.C. players
Association football forwards